The Bureau of Transportation Statistics (BTS), as part of the United States Department of Transportation (US DOT), maintains a list of U.S. state and country codes, named World Area Codes (WAC).

(U.S.) State and (world) country codes

References

Sources and external links 
 http://www.transtats.bts.gov/Fields.asp
 http://www.transtats.bts.gov/DL_SelectFields.asp?Table_ID=315&DB_Short_Name=Aviation%20Support%20Tables
 http://github.com/opentraveldata/opentraveldata/tree/master/data/countries/DOT

Country codes
Location codes